Tošanovice may refer either of two villages in Frýdek-Místek District, Moravian-Silesian Region, Czech Republic:

 Dolní Tošanovice
 Horní Tošanovice